Amblypalpis is a genus of moth in the family Gelechiidae.

Species
 Amblypalpis olivierella Ragonot, 1886
 Amblypalpis tamaricella Danilevski, 1955

References

Gelechiinae
Moth genera
Taxa named by Émile Louis Ragonot